Nosavana phoumii is a species of beetle in the family Cerambycidae. It was described by Stephan von Breuning in 1963.

References

Gyaritini
Beetles described in 1963
Taxa named by Stephan von Breuning (entomologist)